Corporation Island is a small island on the River Thames in London. The island is between Richmond Bridge and Richmond Railway Bridge, where it forms part of the celebrated view from the Richmond waterfront. Its name seems to derive from its owners, the Corporation of Richmond, now the London Borough of Richmond upon Thames. It is uninhabited and heavily wooded, and was formerly known as Richmond Ait.

The unpopulated Corporation Island is densely wooded with white willow, crack willow and weeping willow as well as hybrid black poplar. These were planted in the 1960s after Richmond Borough Council felled the London plane trees which had grown there. The island may have changed its shape due to alterations of the tidal flows in the Thames following the construction of the New London Bridge in 1829 followed by that of the Richmond half-tide lock.

Corporation Island is home to a heronry, a nesting colony of grey heron, which had 12 active nests in 2016. Just downstream from Corporation Island are the last islands on the Surrey stretch of the Thames, the Flowerpot Islands, which are two nearly circular islands covered in willows which were a single island until they were divided into two on the orders of the Duke of Queensbury in 1796. Subsequently, tidal erosion has reduced them to the two tiny islets, or eyots, currently visible.

One of the last photographs of The Beatles together was taken in 1969 of the band sitting on Corporation Island. There now is no public access to the island.

See also
Islands in the River Thames

References

Geography of the London Borough of Richmond upon Thames
Islands of London
Islands of the River Thames
Richmond, London